Mandisa Lynn Hundley (born October 2, 1976), known professionally as Mandisa, is an American gospel and contemporary Christian recording artist. Her career began as a contestant in the fifth season of American Idol, in which she finished in ninth place. She is the fifth American Idol alumna to win a Grammy Award, for her album Overcomer in the Best Contemporary Christian Music Album category.

Early life 

Mandisa Hundley was born and raised in Citrus Heights, California. After graduating from El Camino Fundamental High School, she attended American River College in Sacramento where she studied Vocal Jazz. Then she studied at Fisk University in Tennessee and graduated with a Bachelor of Music degree with a concentration in vocal performance.

American Idol 

Mandisa auditioned for the United States talent competition show American Idol in Chicago, in 2005. She referred to herself as "just Mandisa," thus was billed simply as Mandisa on the show. She stated that her musical influences run the gamut from Whitney Houston to Def Leppard.

Idol judge Simon Cowell made several comments about Mandisa's weight after her successful audition. He first quipped, "Do we have a bigger stage this year?" Then, when Paula Abdul commented that Mandisa had a "Frenchie" growl to her voice, Cowell responded that a more apt comparison would be to France itself. These were among comments that drew the ire of the National Association to Advance Fat Acceptance, (NAAFA) and would be one of the reasons Mandisa would entitle her 2007 album True Beauty.

When Mandisa presented herself to the judges prior to the final cut-down to the season's 24 semi-finalists, she told Cowell: "What I want to say to you is that, yes, you hurt me and I cried and it was painful, it really was. But I want you to know that I've forgiven you and that you don't need someone to apologize in order to forgive somebody. I figure that if Jesus could die so that all of my wrongs could be forgiven, I can certainly extend that same grace to you." Cowell told Mandisa that he was "humbled" and apologized to her immediately.

On the March 7, 2006, Idol show, she stated in her pre-performance video that she sucked her thumb until she was 24 years old. She performed a rendition of Chaka Khan's "I'm Every Woman" which drew praise from all three judges. She was among the 12 contestants chosen on March 9, 2006, as a finalist in Idols fifth season.

Mandisa was eliminated from American Idol on April 5, 2006, in the top nine, having never previously been in the bottom three (she was there with Paris Bennett and Elliott Yamin, neither of whom had been in the bottom three either). Mandisa revealed that, when the first group of Taylor Hicks, Kellie Pickler and Chris Daughtry was sent back to safety, and Mandisa, Elliott and Paris were on the stage on one side and the other group of Ace Young, Katharine McPhee and Bucky Covington on the other side, she told Paris and Elliott that it was most likely their own group in the bottom three, as she remembered how the same thing had happened in the third season, when the three divas landed in the bottom three, and was sure that it would probably be a "shocker" like that one as Ace, Katharine and Bucky had all been in the bottom three earlier. She, like most eliminated contestants, appeared on The Tonight Show with Jay Leno one day later.

Performances

Music career 
On July 27, 2007, after being eliminated from American Idol—Mandisa performed the song "I Don't Hurt Anymore" on the TV talk show Live with Regis and Kelly. She also joined Gladys Knight and others at the Apollo Theater for the benefit concert "Back to Harlem," to raise money for various charities.

Mandisa collaborated with tobyMac and Kirk Franklin on tobyMac's album Portable Sounds.

Mandisa's first full-length album True Beauty was released on July 31, 2007. The album debuted at No. 1 on the Top Christian Albums charts, making it the first time a new female artist has debuted at No. 1 in the chart's 27-year history. It also debuted at No. 43 on the Billboard 200, an unusually high debut on that chart for a Christian artist. It also garnered a Best Pop/Contemporary Gospel Album nomination. Showcasing Mandisa's stylistic range was the task set before the five sets of producers who lined up to work with her on the album: Shaun Shankel, Brown Bannister, Christopher Stevens, Drew Ramsey & Shannon Sanders, and Robert Marvin & Josiah Bell. Mandisa also spent personal time with the album's writers before the songwriting process began, sharing her vision for the project and what she hoped to communicate through the songs.

Her first single, "Only the World," was released on May 22, 2007. The song had a successful debut on the Billboard Hot Singles Sales chart, which tracks commercial single sales, debuting at No. 2 and reached No. 1 the following week. It is also getting major airplay on Christian radio stations. It was written by Matthew West, Sam Mizell and Clint Lagerberg. (West also co-wrote two other songs on album.)

Mandisa's cover of "Shackles" features a horn section provided by LiveHorns.com with Tommy Vaughan on trumpet, Rodney Mills on trombone, and Shane Philen on sax. They also appear on Mandisa's performance of "The Right Thing" on the VeggieTales soundtrack for The Pirates Who Don't Do Anything.

The second single "God Speaking" was released to Christian radio in October 2007. A third single, "Voice of a Savior," written by West, was serviced to Inspo radio in mid-2008, where it peaked in the Top 5 of Radio and Records' Soft AC/Inspo chart.

In November 2007, Mandisa released a holiday EP, Christmas Joy EP, which features the song "Christmas Makes Me Cry", a duet with frequent collaborator Matthew West. Earlier that year, Mandisa also recorded "Christmas Day," a duet with Michael W. Smith. The EP peaked at No. 2 on Billboards Hot Christian AC chart, stopped from reaching No. 1 by her duet with Smith, "Christmas Day". It was the first time in the history of the Christian singles chart that a solo female artist was featured on the top two singles at the same time.

On October 14, 2008, Mandisa released a full-length Christmas album, It's Christmas.

Freedom was released on March 24, 2009.

There have also been reports that Mandisa will be releasing "We Are Family" which is a Bonus Track on Napster on April 14, 2009. The song was available for a short time on Amazon.com added to Freedom labeled as "Freedom + Bonus Track". It also debuted at No. 83 on the Billboard 200.

What If We Were Real, was released on April 11, 2011. In March 2011 she began a tour with comedian Anita Renfroe promoting the album. The first single off "What If We Were Real," a track titled "Stronger," peaked at No. 1 on the Billboard Christian Songs chart on June 18, 2011. The album has remained on the Billboard Christian Albums for 76 consecutive weeks as of September 2012. It debuted at No. 66 on the Billboard 200.

The second single, "Waiting for Tomorrow," peaked at No. 3 on the Billboard Christian Songs chart the week of January 28, 2012. The third single, "Good Morning", features fellow Contemporary Christian musician tobyMac, with whom Mandisa collaborated on "Lose My Soul".

Mandisa's fourth studio album, Overcomer, was released on August 27, 2013, and debuted at No. 29 on the Billboard 200 Albums Chart, her highest peak on that chart to date. The title track "Overcomer" was released in late July, hitting the Billboard Christian Top 20 in its third week on the charts. It went to No. 1 on that chart by October 2013 when it also appeared on the mainstream Bubbling Under chart.

Mandisa won the Best Contemporary Christian Music Album for Overcomer at the 56th Grammy Awards. The title song from the album also won Best Contemporary Christian Music Song for songwriters David Garcia, Ben Glover and Christopher Stevens. She declined to attend the Grammy Awards, however, saying, "I have fallen prey to the alluring pull of flesh, pride, and selfish desires quite a bit recently. I knew that submerging myself into an environment that celebrates those things was risky for me at this time.

Mandisa's fifth full-length album, Out of the Dark, was released on May 19, 2017. The lead single, "Unfinished", was then released on March 10, 2017. The song reached No. 8 on the Billboard Hot Christian Songs Chart. A compilation of her best songs, Overcomer: The Greatest Hits, was released in February 2020.

Personal life 
Mandisa resides in the suburban Nashville community of Antioch, Tennessee. Since her appearance on American Idol in 2006, Mandisa has made efforts toward health and weight loss. The title of her second album, Freedom, was inspired by her experience of overcoming an addiction to food. As of March 2009, she had reportedly lost 75 pounds and hoped to lose a total of 100 or more. As of February 2011, she reached her goal of losing 100 pounds.

In 2013, after the loss of a close friend to breast cancer, Mandisa gained back much of the weight she had originally lost, and had depression and suicidal thoughts. This loss, coupled with a sense of deep betrayal by God, led Mandisa into a dark place, and also led to her virtual disappearance from both public and private view. In May 2017, Mandisa returned to public view, and began to open up about her ordeals, around the same time as the release of her album, Out of the Dark. She hadn't recorded an album in three years.

Discography 

Studio albums

 2007: True Beauty
 2008: It's Christmas
 2009: Freedom
 2011: What If We Were Real
 2013: Overcomer
 2017: Out of the Dark

Awards and nominations

Grammy Awards

GMA Dove Awards

References

External links 
 
 
 February 21, 2006 Sacramento Bee article
 MTV Mandisa Interview
 STREETBRAND Magazine Interview

1976 births
21st-century American singers
African-American Christians
20th-century African-American women singers
American gospel singers
American Idol participants
American performers of Christian music
Fisk University alumni
Grammy Award winners
Living people
Musicians from Nashville, Tennessee
Musicians from Sacramento, California
People from Citrus Heights, California
Performers of contemporary Christian music
Sparrow Records artists
EMI Records artists
21st-century American women singers
People from Antioch, Tennessee
21st-century African-American women singers